John Inskeep Vanmeter (February 1798August 3, 1875) was a U.S. Representative from Ohio.

Born near Moorefield, Virginia (now West Virginia), in February 1798, Vanmeter attended the College of William and Mary, Williamsburg, Virginia, and was graduated from Princeton College in 1821.
He studied law at the Litchfield Law School.
He was admitted to the bar of Virginia in 1822 and commenced practice in Moorefield.
He served as member of the Virginia House of Delegates in 1824.
He retired from practice.
He moved to Pike County, Ohio, in 1826 and engaged in agricultural pursuits.
He served as member of the Ohio House of Representatives in 1836.
He served in the Ohio Senate in 1838.

Vanmeter was elected as a Whig to the Twenty-eighth Congress (March 4, 1843 – March 3, 1845).
He was an unsuccessful candidate for reelection in 1844 to the Twenty-ninth Congress.
He was affiliated with the Democratic Party in 1856.

He moved to Chillicothe, Ohio, in 1855, where he resided until his death August 3, 1875.
He was interred in Grandview Cemetery, Chillicothe, Ross County, Ohio, USA.

Sources

External links 
 

1798 births
1875 deaths
People from Moorefield, West Virginia
People from Pike County, Ohio
Politicians from Chillicothe, Ohio
Ohio Democrats
Ohio state senators
Members of the Ohio House of Representatives
Members of the Virginia House of Delegates
Virginia lawyers
College of William & Mary alumni
Princeton University alumni
Burials at Grandview Cemetery (Chillicothe, Ohio)
Litchfield Law School alumni
Whig Party members of the United States House of Representatives from Ohio
19th-century American politicians